The following is a list of radio stations in Kosovo.

National coverage

Regional coverage

Local coverage

Internet

Notes

External links
  
 Radiomap.eu: Radiostacione në Prishtinë - Kosovë / Радио станици у Приштини - Косово 
 Albania Radio List

 
Kosovo
Radio stations